3 Flotylla Okrętów (3rd Ship Flotilla)  is a tactical unit of the Polish Navy composed of 11 subunits. The unit is a main strike force of the Polish Navy, it operates various warships types such as frigates, corvettes, submarines or fast attack crafts. The main base of 3 FO is Gdynia-Oksywie Naval Base.

Sub-Units
Submarine Unit (Dywizjon Okrętów Podwodnych)
Combat Ship Squadron  (Dywizjon Okrętów Bojowych)
Support Unit (Dywizjon Okrętów Wsparcia)
Reconnaissance Group (Grupa Okrętów Rozpoznawczych, gOR)
9th Anti-Air Wing (9 Dywizjon Przeciwlotniczy)
43rd Sapper Battalion (43 Battalion Saperów)
Naval Base Command (Komenda Portu Wojennego Gdynia)
Technical Base of Polish Navy (Baza Techniczna Marynarki Wojennej)
Hel Peninsula Naval Base (Punkt Bazowania Hel)

Equipment

Vessels

References

Naval units and formations of Poland
Military units and formations established in 1971
Polish intelligence agencies
1971 establishments in Poland
Special forces of Poland
Naval special forces units and formations